Wilhelm Ludwig Ewald Schmidt (4 May 1805 in  (near Potsdam) – 5 June 1843 in Stettin) was a German physician, botanist, and entomologist. As an entomologist, he specialized in Coleoptera.

In 1828 he obtained his medical doctorate in Berlin; afterwards he taught classes at the Royal Gymnasium in Stettin. He was the first president of the  Entomologischer Verein zu Stettin (Entomological Society of Stettin).

Works 
 Flora Sedinensis, exhibens plantas phanerogamas spontaneas, etc.; with Friedrich Wilhelm Gottlieb Rostkovius, 1824.
 Kurze Anweisung für junge Pharmaceuten das Studium der Botanik, 1830 - Short instruction for young pharmacists towards the study of botany.
 Getreue und systematische Beschreibung der officinellen Pflanzen der neuesten Preussischen Landes-pharmacopöe in abellarischer Uebersicht: Ein botanisches Handbuch für Studirende Mediciner und Pharmaceuten bearbeitet (T.C.F. Enslin, 1831) - Accurate and systematic description of officinal plants.
 Botanischer Wegweiser: oder praktische Unterweisung zweckgemäss das Studium der Botanik, 1837 - Botanical guide: or practical training purposes according to study of botany.
 Flora von Pommern und Rügen. Becker und Altendorf, Stettin, 1840 - Flora of Pomerania and Rügen. 
 Verzeichniss europäischer Käfer, 1840 - Directory of European beetles.

References

 Parts of this article are based on a translation of an equivalent article at the Polish Wikipedia.

19th-century German botanists
German entomologists
1805 births
1843 deaths
Coleopterists
Scientists from Potsdam